Walaa Kamal (Arabic: ولاء كمال) is a British-Egyptian writer and translator who was born in the United Kingdom. He published three books including "Silence", "Sayed and the Gand", and "730 Days of Cairokee".

Biography 
Walaa Kamal, a British-Egyptian writer and translator, was born in the United Kingdom on 1984. He moved to Egypt in 2000 and studied at the Ain Shams University where he obtained his bachelor's degree in Mass Communication. Years later, he studied translation at the American University in Cairo. Then, he studied at the Academy of Cinema Arts and Technology. In 2017, Kamal published his first book after five years of writing it titled "Silence" which was published by Sama Publishing and Production and Distribution and was released at the Cairo International Book Fair in its 48 session. In 2018, he published his second book "Sayed and the Gang". A year later, he published "730 Days with Cairokee". His last book was chosen among the best books for 2019. In his last book, Kamal writers about his journey with the Egyptian rock band "Cairokee" in which he documents their lives on and off the stage and the struggles they faced since the beginning of their artistic career. Kamal has also translated some books including "One Belt, One Road – China's and the New Eurasian Century" by William Engdahl which was published at the Abu Dhabi International Book Fair, 2017.

Bibliography

Books 

 "Silence" (original title: Sukoon"), 2017
 "Sayed and the Gang" (original title: Sayed w al A'saba), 2018
 "730 Days with Cairokee" (original title: Ayami Maa Cairokee), 2019

Translation 

 Al Qarn Al Rawasi, Mashroo Al Hizam w Al Tareq (original title: One Belt, One Road – China's and the New Eurasian Century" by William Engdahl.

References

External links 

Egyptian writers
British writers
21st-century Egyptian writers
21st-century British writers
Living people
Egyptian translators
1984 births
21st-century translators